Laranjeiras (orange trees) is an upper-middle-class neighborhood located in the South Zone of Rio de Janeiro, Brazil. Primarily residential, It is one of the city's oldest neighborhoods, having been founded in the 17th century, with the construction of country houses in the valley located around the Carioca River, which bordered Corcovado Mountain. Because of this, the neighborhood was previously called Vale do Carioca, or Carioca Valley.

While primarily residential, several important governmental, cultural, and sports institutions and schools make this a bustling neighborhood.  Well known landmarks in Laranjeiras include the Guanabara Palace (seat of the state government of Rio de Janeiro), the Palácio Laranjeiras (official residence of the state's governor), and the Parque Guinle (Eduardo Guinle Park), as well as the headquarters and Laranjeiras Stadium of Fluminense Football Club, and Rio's branch of the Hebraica Social and Sports Club, and several others.

Laranjeiras is adjacent to the Cosme Velho, Catete, Flamengo and Botafogo Neighborhoods.

Infrastructure
Laranjeiras' main streets (ruas) are:

Rua das Laranjeiras
Rua Conde de Baependi
Rua Pinheiro Machado
Rua General Glicério
Rua Pereira da Silva
Rua Alice
Rua São Salvador
Rua Gago Coutinho
Rua Mário Portela 
Rua Sebastião Lacerda
Rua Cardoso Júnior
Rua Pires de Almeida.
Rua Ipiranga
Rua Soares Cabral
Rua Almirante Benjamin Sodré
Rua Álvaro Chaves
Rua Moura Brasil

People
Well-known people that live, or have lived in Laranjeiras include:

Cartola (Angenor de Oliveira), singer, composer and poet.
Cássia Eller, singer.
Machado de Assis, writer.
Mel Lisboa, actress.
Paulo Gracindo, actor.
Heráclito Fontoura Sobral Pinto, human rights lawyer.
Oscar Niemeyer, architect.
 Adriana Lisboa, author
 Carola Saavedra, author

Events
General Glicério Fair:

The fair takes place every Saturday morning at General Glicério street. It is a traditional event for the residents of the neighborhood, where you can find fresh fruits and fishes, as well as the favorite Brazilian fair food, sugarcane juice and "pastel" (fried pie). Families and friends can also enjoy great Choro music or "Chorinho", an instrumental Brazilian popular music genre which originated in 19th century Rio de Janeiro.

Education

The Lycée Molière de Rio de Janeiro or Liceu Molière, the French international school, is in this neighborhood.

References

External links
Os Bairros (the districts of Rio de Janeiro, in Portuguese)

Neighbourhoods in Rio de Janeiro (city)